Ernesto Hernán Rodríguez Gómez (born January 15, 1969 in Cordoba, Argentina) is a volleyball player who represented Spain at the 2000 Summer Olympics in Sydney, Australia. There he finished ninth place with the Men's National Team. He also competed at the 1992 Summer Olympics in Barcelona, Spain.

Sporting achievements

National team
 1995  Universiade

References

  Spanish Olympic Committee

1969 births
Living people
Spanish men's volleyball players
Volleyball players at the 1992 Summer Olympics
Volleyball players at the 2000 Summer Olympics
Olympic volleyball players of Spain
Sportspeople from Córdoba, Argentina
Argentine emigrants to Spain
Universiade medalists in volleyball
Universiade silver medalists for Spain
Medalists at the 1995 Summer Universiade